A New Shape of Desperation the second full album by the extreme metal band By Night.

Tracks
"(It Starts Within)" – 0:32
"The Truth Is Sold" – 3:32
"People Like You" – 4:41
"Through Ashes We Crawl" – 3:33
"Same Old Story" – 4:06
"Dead Eyes See No Future" – 2:31
"Walls of Insecure" – 4:12
"Idiot" – 0:55
"Forsaken Love" – 4:46
"Cursed by the Thought" – 4:23
"Time Is Running Out" – 3:25

Personnel
Adrian Westin – vocals
André Gonzales – Lead and rhythm guitar
Henrik Persson – Rhythm and lead guitar
Markus Wesslén – Bass
Per Qvarnström – drums

By Night albums
2006 albums